Tullamarine Football Club is an Australian rules football club is located 17 km north west of  Melbourne in the suburb of  Tullamarine  and is affiliated with the Essendon District Football League.

History

Formed in 1974 and known as Essendon-Tullamarine after a merger between Essendon Baptist St John’s and Ascot Vale Presbyterians, Tullamarine was a success from the outset, with its five successive A Grade flags between 1975 and 1979 establishing an Essendon District Football League record which still stands. More recently, the club has enjoyed intermittent success. Essendon Baptist Saint John’s was a noteworthy presence in the EDFL for many years, winning a B Grade premiership in 1956, and an A Grade flag two seasons later. Among the club’s products were fourteen Essendon footballers including Ron Evans, Ted Fordham, Ken Fraser and Don McKenzie. The club dropped Essendon from its name in 1981 and became Tullamarine F.C. also winning its first B Grade premiership in the same year.
Its colours are blue and red and are known as the Demons they have the same jumper and mascot as Melbourne Football Club have in the AFL.
Tullamarine have remained a strong force in the 1st division of the EDFL for much of the 2010s, with a brief and unsuccessful stint in the premier division in 2004. It enjoys strong junior and local support, and new players and members are more than welcome as the club is known as "The Friendly club" because of its friendly environment and its willingness to welcome anybody to join.

The club's latest senior premiership was the 2003 win over West Coburg 13.17.95 to 10.10.70.

Since 2003 the seniors have been runners up in 2007, 2008, 2014 and 2016, they have also made the finals every year between 2005 and 2019 only missing out in 2012. They are coached by former premiership player and Westmeadows coach David Connell.

Ground
Their home ground is Leo Dineen Reserve in Spring Street, Tullamarine and has been since it moved there in 1977, redevelopment of the ground have begun and social rooms redevelopments will start soon making it one of the better grounds in the area and in the E.D.F.L.
It's also the home of the Tullamarine Cricket Club.

Major sponsors
Jinavo Plumbing & Drainage
The Paper Cup Company, Tullamarine
Strathmore Community Bank, Branch of Bendigo Bank
Telstra Business Centre Essendon & Airport West
Total Tools Tullamarine
Jason Real Estate
Delancey Legal

Premierships
A Grade
1975, 1976, 1977, 1978, 1979

B Grade
1981, 1993, 2003

B Reserves 
1986, 1989, 1991, 1992

U18 B Grade Div 2
1980, 1983, 1988, 1991

U16 Div 1
1989

U16 Div 2
1979, 1986, 1987, 1988, 1990

U16 Div 3
2008

U14 Div 2
1993

U12 Div 2
1990, 2002

U10 Div 1
2003

U10 Div 2
1989, 2002

U10 Div 3
2014

External links
 Tullamarine at Full Points Footy
 Essendon DFL website

Essendon District Football League clubs
1974 establishments in Australia
Australian rules football clubs established in 1974
Australian rules football clubs in Melbourne
Sport in the City of Hume